Horohira-Bashi Station (幌平橋駅) is a Sapporo Municipal Subway station in Chūō-ku, Sapporo, Hokkaido, Japan. The station number is N10.

Platforms

Surrounding area
 Seishūgakuen-Mae Station, Sapporo Streetcar
 Nakajima Park
 Gokoku Shrine
 Minami Jūyo-Jō Post Office
 Minami Nakajima Police Station
 Hokkaido Bank, Nakajima branch

External links

 Sapporo Subway Stations

Railway stations in Japan opened in 1971
Railway stations in Sapporo
Sapporo Municipal Subway
Chūō-ku, Sapporo